CapeNature (officially the Western Cape Nature Conservation Board) is a governmental organisation responsible for maintaining wilderness areas and public nature reserves in Western Cape Province, South Africa.

Parks managed by CapeNature

West Coast
Cederberg Wilderness Area
Bird Island Nature Reserve
Rocherpan Nature Reserve
Groot Winterhoek Wilderness Area
Knersvlakte Nature Reserve
Riverlands Nature Reserve

Winelands
Limietberg Nature Reserve
Jonkershoek Nature Reserve
Assegaaibosch Nature Reserve
Hottentots Holland Nature Reserve
Vrolijkheid Nature Reserve

Overberg
Marloth Nature Reserve
Kogelberg Nature Reserve
Walker Bay Nature Reserve
Salmonsdam Nature Reserve
De Mond Nature Reserve
De Hoop Nature Reserve
Grootvadersbosch Nature Reserve
Boosmansbos Wilderness Area

Cape Karoo
Anysberg Nature Reserve
Swartberg Nature Reserve
Gamkaberg Nature Reserve
Kamanassie Nature Reserve

Garden Route and Little Karoo
Outeniqua Nature Reserve
Goukamma Nature Reserve
Keurbooms River Nature Reserve
Robberg Nature Reserve

See also

References

External links 

 CapeNature

1999 establishments in South Africa
Government agencies established in 1999
Environmental agencies of country subdivisions